Zakładowy Klub Sportowy Stal Stalowa Wola, shortly ZKS Stal Stalowa Wola or simply Stal Stalowa Wola, is a Polish multi-sports club based in Stalowa Wola, Poland. It operates a men's soccer (training youths), men's basketball and women's basketball sections.

History  
In 1938, who was the director of Huta Stalowa Wola, established the Klub Sportowy Stalowa Wola (Sports Club Stalowa Wola). At that time, the club had a pitch without running tracks and stands. The players were amateurs. During this period, training sessions took place after finishing work, and the matches were played on Sunday. The first match took place on May 4, 1939, in the Saint Florian's Day who is the patron saint of steelworkers.

Olympian Lucjan Trela was part of the boxing section of the club.

Sections

Current 
 Stal Stalowa Wola (basketball)
 
 Stal Stalowa Wola (youth football)

Historical 
 Stal Stalowa Wola (football) (disbanded, playing as a separate entity)
 Stal Stalowa Wola (ice hockey)

References

External links 
 ZKS Stal Stalowa Wola website 

 
Multi-sport clubs in Poland
Sports clubs in Poland
Sports clubs established in 1938